The 2021–22 Scottish League Two (known as cinch League Two for sponsorship reasons) was the ninth season of Scottish League Two, the fourth tier of Scottish football. The season began on 31 July.

Ten teams contested the league: Albion Rovers, Annan Athletic, Cowdenbeath, Edinburgh City, Elgin City, Forfar Athletic, Kelty Hearts, Stenhousemuir, Stirling Albion and Stranraer.

Teams
The following teams changed division after the 2020–21 season.

To League Two
Promoted from Lowland Football League
 Kelty Hearts

Relegated from League One
 Forfar Athletic

From League Two
Relegated to Highland Football League
 Brechin City

Promoted to League One
 Queen's Park

Stadia and locations

Personnel and kits

Managerial changes

League summary

League table

Results

Matches 1–18
Teams play each other twice, once at home and once away.

Matches 19–36
Teams play each other twice, once at home and once away.

Season statistics

Scoring

Top scorers

Awards

League Two play-offs
The Pyramid play-off was contested between the champions of the 2021–22 Highland Football League (Fraserburgh) and the 2021–22 Lowland Football League (Bonnyrigg Rose Athletic). The winners (Bonnyrigg Rose Athletic) then faced the bottom club in League Two (Cowdenbeath) in the play-off final. As Bonnyrigg Rose Athletic won the final, they were promoted to League Two for the 2022–23 season and Cowdenbeath were relegated to the Lowland League.

Pyramid play-off

First leg

Second leg

Final

First leg

Second leg

References

External links
Official website

Scottish League Two seasons
4
4
Scot